Piptostigma is a genus of plant in family Annonaceae. It contains the following species (but this list may be incomplete):

 Piptostigma calophyllum, Mildler. & Diels
 Piptostigma fugax, A.Chev. ex Hutch. & Dlaz.
 Piptostigma giganteum, Hutch. & Dalz.
 Piptostigma oyemense, Pellegrin

References

Annonaceae
Annonaceae genera
Taxonomy articles created by Polbot
Taxa named by Daniel Oliver